The Social Democratic People's Party may refer to:

 Social Democratic People's Party (Djibouti)
 Social Democratic People's Party (Turkey)

Political party disambiguation pages